Ana Milena Fagua Raquira (born 27 July 1992) is a Colombian racing cyclist. She competed in the 2013 UCI women's road race in Florence.

Major results
Source: 

2013
 9th Grand Prix GSB
2015
 4th Overall Vuelta a Cundinamarca
2019
 5th Overall Vuelta a Colombia Femenina
2021
 3rd Time trial, National Road Championships
 6th Overall Vuelta a Colombia Femenina

References

External links
 

1992 births
Living people
Colombian female cyclists
Place of birth missing (living people)
21st-century Colombian women